Alberta Provincial Highway No. 35, commonly referred to as Highway 35, is a north–south highway in northwest Alberta, Canada that forms a portion of the Mackenzie Highway.

It continues on as Northwest Territories Highway 1. It is one of only two highway-grade roads connecting the NWT with a province (the other being the Liard Highway), and the only one connecting the NWT with Alberta. Highway 35 passes through the towns of Manning and High Level.

Major intersections 
From south to north:

References

External links 

Mackenzie Highway, Grimshaw to Hay River

035